Patrick Joseph Oboya Onyango (born 19 February 1987), known as Patrick Oboya, is a former Kenyan footballer who played as a midfielder. He has also appeared for the Kenya national team, where he last played for the side in a friendly against Tanzania on 14 November 2012.

Club career

Early career and Europe
Before moving abroad, Oboya played for two Kenyan Premier League clubs. He joined Leopards in September 2005 before transferring to Tusker in January 2006. In February 2007, he joined the Czech team Baník Most. After nearly four years in the Czech Republic, he moved to Slovak club Ružomberok on a three-year contract in January 2012

Gor Mahia
On 1 July 2013, it was announced that Kenyan Premier League side Gor Mahia signed Oboya the previous day after a successful medical. He made his debut for K'Ogalo on 17 July 2013, coming off the bench to replace Paul Kiongera in the 79th minute and help his side ensure a 2–0 league win over Chemelil Sugar at the Nyayo National Stadium.

Tusker
On 26 January 2015, it was announced that Oboya joined Tusker after spending a season and a half with Gor Mahia. He made his debut for the side in their first league game of the 2015 season on 21 February, playing out a 1–1 draw against Thika United at the Thika Municipal Stadium.

International career
Oboya has made 29 appearances for the Kenya national team, the Harambee Stars, and scored two goals. He was the top scorer for Kenya in the qualifiers for Ghana 2008 with two goals.

References

External links
 
 

1987 births
Living people
Kenyan footballers
Kenya international footballers
Kenyan expatriate footballers
A.F.C. Leopards players
Tusker F.C. players
Gor Mahia F.C. players
Kakamega Homeboyz F.C. players
Kenyan Premier League players
FK Baník Most players
FK Fotbal Třinec players
Czech First League players
Czech National Football League players
Expatriate footballers in the Czech Republic
Kenyan expatriate sportspeople in the Czech Republic
MFK Ružomberok players
Slovak Super Liga players
Expatriate footballers in Slovakia
Kenyan expatriate sportspeople in Slovakia
V.League 1 players
Expatriate footballers in Vietnam
Kenyan expatriate sportspeople in Vietnam
Association football midfielders